Mahesh Bhupathi and Leander Paes were the defending champions, but Bhupathi did not participate this year.  Paes partnered Byron Black, losing in the quarterfinals.

Julien Boutter and Christophe Rochus won in the final 7–5, 6–1, against Srinath Prahlad and Saurav Panja.

Seeds

Draw

Draw

External links
Draw

2000 Gold Flake Open
2000 ATP Tour
Maharashtra Open